The Beta-Lactamase Database (BLAD) is a web-based antimicrobial resistance database that provides structural and phenotypic data on a class of enzymes, beta-lactamase. It hosts sequences from all classes of metallo and non-metallo beta-lactamases. The resource has approximately 2000 gene sequences and compiles its data from various literature, NCBI, protein data bank  and other mediums. BLAD is based at the Aligarh Muslim University in the Interdisciplinary Biotechnology Unit. BLAD has four search fields on their site: database, resistance, PDBS, and genome.

When looking at their database tab, users are able to see NCBI cross-linked information about sequences, specifically looking at nucleotides and proteins. This data can also be exported for the entry of interest. Under the resistance tab, information about beta-lactamases that confer resistance to antimicrobial drugs is available. PDBS, or Protein Data Bank file formatting, has three-dimensional structural information on beta-lactamases, their variants, and associated ligands. Lastly, the genome tab provides information of the plasmids that contain the beta-lactamase gene and identifying characteristics.

References 

Antimicrobial resistance organizations
Biological databases